Clip Studio Paint (previously marketed as Manga Studio in North America), informally known in Japan as , is a family of software applications developed by Japanese graphics software company Celsys. It is used for the digital creation of comics, general illustration, and 2D animation. The software is available in versions for macOS, Windows, iOS, iPadOS, Android, and ChromeOS.

The application is sold in editions with varying feature sets. The full-featured edition is a page-based, layered drawing program, with support for bitmap and vector art, text, imported 3D models, and frame-by-frame animation. It is designed for use with a stylus and a graphics tablet or tablet computer. It has drawing tools which emulate natural media such as pencils, ink pens, and brushes, as well as patterns and decorations. It is distinguished from similar programs by features designed for creating comics: tools for creating panel layouts, perspective rulers, sketching, inking, applying tones and textures, coloring, and creating word balloons and captions.

History
The original version of the program ran on macOS and Windows, and was released in Japan as "Comic Studio" in 2001. It was sold as "Manga Studio" in the Western market by E Frontier America until 2007, then by Smith Micro Software until 2017; after which it has been sold and supported by Celsys and Graphixly LLC. 

Early versions of the program were designed for creating black and white art with only spot color (a typical format for Japanese manga), but version 4 – released in 2007 – introduced support for creating full-color art. In 2013 a redesigned version of the program was introduced, one based on Celsys' separate Comic Studio and Illust Studio applications. Sold in different markets as "Clip Studio Paint" version 1 or "Manga Studio" version 5, the new application featured new coloring and text-handling tools, and a new file system which stored the data for each page in a single file (extension .lip), rather than the multiple files used for each page by Manga Studio 4 and earlier. In 2015, Comic Studio and Illust Studio were discontinued.

In 2016, the name "Manga Studio" was deprecated, with the program sold in all markets as "Clip Studio Paint". The version released under this unified branding (build 1.5.4 of the redesigned application) also introduced a new file format (extension .clip) and frame-by-frame animation. In late 2017, Celsys took over direct support for the software worldwide, and ceased its relationship with Smith Micro. In July 2018, Celsys began a partnership with Graphixly for distribution in North America, South America, and Europe.

Clip Studio Paint for the Apple iPad was introduced in November 2017, and for the iPhone in December 2019. Clip Studio Paint for Samsung Galaxy tablets and smartphones was released in August 2020, with versions for other Android devices and Chromebooks released in December.

The Windows and macOS versions of the software have been sold and distributed either from the developer's web site or on DVD, and purchased either with a perpetual license or an ongoing subscription. The versions for iPhone, iPad, and Android-based devices are distributed through the corresponding app stores free of charge, but require a subscription – which includes cloud storage – for unrestricted use; without a subscription the tablet versions can be used for only a specified number of months, and the phone versions can be used for only 1 hour per day.

Regular updates for version 1 were distributed free of additional charge, to both perpetual and subscription users. With the release of version 2 in 2023, users with perpetual licenses who wish to upgrade need either a new license (offered at a discount or free, depending on date of original purchase), the annual purchase of an "upgrade pass", or to switch to subscription licensing. Purchasing the "update pass" provides early access to features planned to be included in version 3 and its subsequent releases for 12 months, after which the software will revert back to the original license (1.13 or 2.0).

Editions
The application has been sold in various editions, with differing feature sets and prices.

Early versions were sold in Japan as: Mini with very limited features (bundled with graphics tablets), Debut with entry-level features, Pro as the standard edition, and EX as the full-feature edition. 

E Frontier and Smith Micro only sold the Debut and EX editions of the original application; with the overhauled version 5, Smith Micro sold only the Pro and EX editions, as standard and advanced editions of the program.

Under the Clip Studio Paint branding, the application is available in three editions: Debut (only bundled with tablets), Pro (adds support for vector-based drawing, custom textures, and comics-focused features), and EX (adds support for multi-page documents, book exporting). 

Companion programs include Clip Studio (for managing and sharing digital assets distributed through the Clip Studio web site, managing licenses, and getting updates and support) and Clip Studio Modeler (for setting up 3D materials to use in Clip Studio Paint).

See also
RETAS
Adobe Photoshop
Corel Painter
Krita

Notes

References

External links

Manga Studio/Comic Studio
e frontier America, Inc. page: Manga Studio 3.0
CELSYS, Inc. Comic Studio page: 4.0 English, On-de-Manga, Comic Studio Aqua 1.0 for Mac OS 9/X, 1.5 Japan, 2.0 Japan, 3.0 Japan, 4.0 Japan
Smith Micro Software, Inc. Manga Studio page: 3.0 Debut, 3.0 EX, 4.0

Manga Studio/Clip Studio Paint
Smith Micro Software, Inc. page: Manga Studio 5, Clip Studio Paint
CELSYS,Inc. Clip Studio Paint page:  , 

 

 (in Japanese)

IOS software
MacOS graphics software
Windows graphics-related software
2001 software
Raster graphics editors
2D animation software
Proprietary cross-platform software
Graphics software
Android (operating system) software